The 2015 County Championship Shield was the 11th version of the annual English rugby union County Championship, organized by the RFU for the tier 3 English counties.  Each county drew its players from rugby union clubs from the fifth tier and below of the English rugby union league system.  The counties were divided into three pools of four teams each, based roughly on regional lines, with the winner of each group plus the best runner-up going through to the semi-finals, with the winners of those games meeting in the final held at Twickenham Stadium. At the moment there is no promotion or relegation out of or into the County Championship Shield, although the 2014 champions Surrey moved up into tier 2, having won the competition three years in a row.

After winning their respective groups and semi final matches Leicestershire faced Cumbria in the late kick off game at Twickenham Stadium.  Leicestershire made up for their defeat the previous season by defeating Cumbria 34 – 17 to win their first ever Shield trophy.

Competition format
The competition format consisted of three groups of four counties each, based roughly on regional lines where possible, with each team playing each other once. The top side of each group automatically qualified for the semi-finals, as did the best group runner-up. The winners of the semi-finals  played in the final held at Twickenham Stadium on 31 May 2015, As the lowest tier in the county championship there is no relegation while promotion is not given every season, although outstanding county performances (such as Surrey's) can lead to counties moving up to tier 2.

Participating counties and ground locations

Group stage

Pool 1

Round 1

Round 2

Round 3

Pool 2

Round 1

Round 2

Round 3

Pool 3

Round 1

Round 2

Round 3

Knock-out Stage

Semi-finals

Final

See also
 English rugby union system
 Rugby union in England

References

External links
 NCA Rugby

2015
2014–15 County Championship